Black Nativity is a 2013 American musical drama film directed by Kasi Lemmons. The script, written by Lemmons, is based on Langston Hughes' 1961 play of the same name and released on November 27, 2013. The film stars an ensemble cast, featuring Forest Whitaker, Angela Bassett, Tyrese Gibson, Jennifer Hudson, Mary J. Blige, Jacob Latimore, Vondie Curtis-Hall, and rapper Nas.

Plot
After his mother, Naima, is evicted from their Baltimore apartment, teenage Langston is sent to spend the holidays with his estranged grandparents in New York City. He talks to a man called Isaiah on the bus.("Sometimes I Feel Like a Motherless Child") When Langston arrives in the city, he just misses his grandparents and, shortly after, is robbed of his possessions. Entering a hotel to get directions to his grandparents' place, Langston is accused of trying to take a wallet and is quickly taken in by the police.  While in the holding cell, he meets a man who makes fun of him for stealing wallets. Shortly after, Langston is reunited with his grandfather, the Reverend Cobbs, who takes him to his home. On the way, they meet a pregnant lady called Maria.

Langston is taken aback by the comfortable home his grandparents live in and by the fact that they know nothing about him and his mother Naima. In an attempt to bond with Langston, the Reverend shows him a pocket watch with a personalized inscription from Martin Luther King Jr. Langston pockets the watch. Maria & Jo-Jo come carol singing ("Silent Night") and Langston is told they are homeless.

In the morning, Langston tries to pawn the watch. However, the pawnshop owner is a friend of his grandfather and refuses to buy it, telling Langston to treasure the pocket watch and return it to his grandfather. Outside the pawnbroker's shop, Langston meets the man he met in the holding cell. The man is passing out flyers for the pawnbroker and offers to procure for him whatever he wants. Langston tries to talk to his grandmother, Aretha, about why his mother left. She denies that he was the cause of the rift but says that his father was the reason behind their estrangement. Before leaving for church, Langston finds the man from the jail cell, the same man from the corner of the pawnshop, and asks him for a gun. The man then tells Langston to meet him at the same spot later at night.

Despite his reluctance to attend church, Aretha and the Reverend pressure him to attend church as they are performing Langston Hughes' play Black Nativity. Langston sees the man from the pawnshop & Maria and the young man from an earlier scene. While there, Langston falls asleep and dreams that he is a part of the nativity ("Sweet Little Jesus Boy"), with Maria, a young pregnant woman he met earlier, playing the part of the virgin Mary. Waking up, Langston leaves the church to meet with the man he met in the jail cell. The man shows him the gun he wanted and Langston takes it from him and then tries to hold him up, asking him to give him a ring he spotted earlier in the display case and all the cash in the pawnbroker's cash register. Instead, the man quotes A Dream Deferred to him and reveals that he is Langston's father, Tyson. A passing police officer spots the two and enters, but Langston's father convinces him that they were only having an argument and Langston was only trying to convince him to go to church with him. The police officer then drives them to the church where they meet Naima.

Inside the church with his father and mother, Langston asks his grandfather what happened between his parents. The Reverend confesses that he gave Tyson five thousand dollars to leave Naima and Langston, hoping that Naima would return to her parents. Instead, Naima found out what her father had done and left with Langston, cutting off both Tyson and her parents. Naima tries to leave with Langston, but he urges her to forgive her parents. She does, and the entire family is reunited at last. ("As")

Cast
 Forest Whitaker as Reverend Cornell Cobbs
 Angela Bassett as Aretha Cobbs
 Tyrese Gibson as Tyson/Loot 
 Jennifer Hudson as Naima Cobbs
 Mary J. Blige as Angel
 Vondie Curtis-Hall as Pawnbroker
 Nas as Isaiah
 Jacob Latimore as Langston
 Rotimi as Officer Butch McDaniels
 Luke James as Jo-Jo/Joseph
 Grace Gibson as Maria/Mary

Reception
On Rotten Tomatoes, the film holds an approval of 50% based on 90 reviews, and an average rating of 5.6/10. The website's critical consensus reads: "It's sweetly amiable and solidly performed, but Black Nativity suffers from director Kasi Lemmons' heavy-handed treatment of its celebrated source material." On Metacritic, the film has a weighted average score of 48 out of 100, based on 29 critics, indicating "mixed or average reviews". Audiences polled by CinemaScore gave the film an average grade of "A−" on an A+ to F scale.

Accolades

See also
 List of Christmas films
List of black films of the 2010s

References

External links
 
 
 
 

2013 films
2010s musical drama films
2010s Christmas drama films
Films directed by Kasi Lemmons
African-American musical drama films
Fox Searchlight Pictures films
Films based on musicals
Films set in Baltimore
Films set in New York City
Films shot in New York City
American Christmas drama films
2013 drama films
2010s English-language films
2010s American films
TSG Entertainment films